Autódromo Internacional Virgílio Távora is a  motorsport race track located in Eusébio, Ceará, Brazil. The circuit was inaugurated on 12 January 1969 with the event of Grande Prêmio Ministro Mário Andreazza. The circuit is mainly used for the national events, however it also hosted some international events, such as Formula 3 Sudamericana between 2000 and 2002. The circuit was closed in 1993, and re-opened on 30 November 1997.

Layout configurations

Lap records

The official fastest lap records at the Autódromo Internacional Virgílio Távora are listed as:

References

External links
Circuit information

Motorsport venues in Ceará
Sports venues in Ceará
1969 establishments in Brazil